Calocedrus formosana (syn. C. macrolepis var. formosana (Florin) W.C.Cheng & L.K.Fu; Taiwan Incense-cedar;  or ) is a conifer endemic to Taiwan.

Descriptions
It is a medium-size tree to 20–25 m tall, with a trunk up to 3 meters in diameter. The bark is orange-brown weathering greyish, smooth at first, becoming fissured and exfoliating in long strips on the lower trunk on old trees. The foliage is produced in flattened sprays with scale-like leaves 1.5–8 mm long; they are arranged in opposite decussate pairs, with the successive pairs closely then distantly spaced, so forming apparent whorls of four; the facial pairs are flat, with the lateral pairs folded over their bases. The upper side of the foliage sprays is green without stomata, the underside is marked with dense patches of white stomata.

The seed cones are 10–15 mm long, pale purple with a whitish wax coating, with four (rarely six) scales arranged in opposite decussate pairs; the outer pair of scales each bears two winged seeds, the inner pair(s) usually being sterile; the cones are borne on a 4–6 mm long peduncle covered in small (2 mm) scale leaves. The cones turn brown when mature about 8 months after pollination. The pollen cones are 4–5 mm long.

Variety species
It is very similar to Calocedrus macrolepis, and some botanists treat it as a variety of that, C. macrolepis var. formosana. They differ most obviously in the longer cone stem, 10–20 mm long, of C. macrolepis.

Threats
The species has a very limited native range of less than 5,000 km², and is threatened by over-harvesting for its valuable wood and conversion of natural forest to plantations of faster-growing exotic species. Some areas are now protected in reserves, and a limited amount of replanting is taking place, but an overall decline continues. It is categorised by the International Union for Conservation of Nature as an endangered species.

See also 
 Cedar wood

References

formosana
Endemic flora of Taiwan
Trees of Taiwan
Endangered flora of Asia